Paulo Afonso is a city in Bahia, Brazil. It was founded in 1958.

The city is the seat of the Roman Catholic Diocese of Paulo Afonso.
The city is served by Paulo Afonso Airport.

The municipality contains part of the Raso da Catarina ecoregion.
The municipality holds part of the  Rio São Francisco Natural Monument, which protects the spectacular canyons of the São Francisco River between the Paulo Afonso Hydroelectric Complex and the Xingó Dam.
It contains part of the  Raso da Catarina Ecological Station, created in 2001.

References

...

Municipalities in Bahia